The Other Side Of Me is the autobiographical memoir of American writer Sidney Sheldon published in 2005. It was also his final book.

Overview

Growing up in 1930s America, the young Sidney knew what it was to struggle. Millions were out of work and the Sheldon family was forced to journey around America in search of employment. Sidney worked nights as a busboy, a clerk, and an usher.

His dream was to become a writer and to break into Hollywood. He found work as a reader for David Selznick, a top Hollywood producer, and the dream began to materialize. Sheldon worked through the night writing stories for the movies. Little by little, he gained a reputation. However, it was war time. He trained as a pilot in the U.S. Army Air Corps in Utah and then waited in New York for the call to arms which could put a stop to his dreams of stardom.  While waiting, he wrote librettos for Broadway shows.

In this book, Sheldon reveals that he was subject to frequent mood swings and often felt inappropriate emotions for his circumstances. At age 17, he seriously considered suicide. Later, at 31, he observed that he felt suicidal on what should have been the happiest day of his life when he won an Academy Award for his screenplay for The Bachelor and the Bobby-Soxer.  He sought psychiatric help and was diagnosed as manic depressive (bipolar).

See also 
 The Other Side of Midnight

American memoirs
American autobiographies
Works by Sidney Sheldon
2005 non-fiction books